Imran, also transliterated as Emran ( ʿImrān) is an Arabic form of the Hebrew male name ʿAmram in the Middle East and other Muslim countries. The name Imran is found in the Quranic chapter called House of ʿImrān (āl ʿImrān). It is derived from the Biblical name ʿAmram. 

It may refer to:

Given name
 Imran, father of Moses in the Quran: see Amram
 Imran, father of Mary in the Quran: see Joachim (Imran)
 āl ʿimrān, the 3rd Chapter in the Quran
 Imran (cricketer), Afghan cricketer
 Imran Abbas, Pakistani actor
 Imran Abbas (cricketer), Pakistani cricketer
 Imran Amed, Canadian-British fashion expert and founder of The Business of Fashion
 Imran Arif, Pakistani-born English cricketer
 Imran Aslam (actor), Pakistani television actor
 Imran Aslam (journalist), Pakistani journalist and media personality
 Imran Awan, Pakistani-American Information Technology worker
 Imran Awan (cricketer), Pakistani born American cricketer
 Emran Barakzai, Afghani-Dutch football player
 Emran bin Bahar, Bruneian diplomat
 Omran Daqneesh, Syrian airstrike victim
 Imran Farhat (born 1982), Pakistani cricketer
 Imraan Faruque, American designer and author
 Imran Garda, Qatari news anchor
 Emraan Hashmi, Indian actor
 Imran Hashmi (footballer), Pakistani footballer
 Imran ibn Husain, one of the companions of Muhammad and a narrator of Hadith
 Imran Hussain (footballer), Pakistani footballer
 Imran Jafferally, West Indies cricketer
 Omran Jesmi, Emirati footballer
 Imran Ullah Khan, Pakistani Army General
 Imraan Khan, South African cricketer
 Imran Riaz Khan (born 1975), Pakistani journalist and YouTuber
 Imran Khan (born 1952), Pakistani cricketer and 22nd Prime Minister of Pakistan
 Imran Khan (cricketer, born 1984), West Indian cricketer
 Imran Khan (Bollywood actor) (born 1983), American actor
 Imran Khan (singer), Dutch-born Pakistani Punjabi singer
 Emran Mian, British Pakistani author
 Abu Talib ibn Abd al-Muttalib (549–619), uncle of Muhammad; his first name is believed to be Imran
 Imran Majid, English pool player
 Imran Mohamed, Maldivian footballer
 Imran Niazi, Pakistani footballer
 Imran Nazir (cricketer) (born 1981), Pakistani cricketer
 Imran Nazir (politician), Pakistani politician
 Imran Nazir (writer), Pakistani writer
 Imran Parvez, Bangladeshi cricketer
 Imran Shahid, ringleader of gang responsible for the murder of Kriss Donald in Scotland
 'Imran ibn Shahin, Nabataean founder of a state in the Batihah
 Imran Sherwani, English field hockey player
 Imran Tahir, Pakistani-born South African cricketer
 Imran Usmanov, Chechen musician
 Imran Yusuf, Kenyan-born British stand-up comedian
 Omran al-Zoubi, Syrian politician

Surname

 Ahmed Omran, Egyptian footballer
 Aseel Omran, Saudi singer
 Mir Imran, Indian entrepreneur and venture capitalist
 Mohammad Reithaudin Awang Imran, Malaysian footballer
 Muhammad Imran, Pakistani hockey player
 Muhammad Umran, Syrian defense minister
 Nabil Omran, Libyan futsal player
 Tariq Imran, Pakistani Olympic field hockey player
 Sheikh Tushar Imran (born 1983), Bangladeshi cricketer

Fictional characters
 Ali Imran, the protagonist of the Imran series
 Imran Habeeb, in British soap opera Coronation Street
 Imran Zakhaev, the main antagonist of the game Call of Duty 4: Modern Warfare
 Imran Maalik, in British soap opera Hollyoaks

See also
 Imran (disambiguation)
 Imrani (1454–1536), Judæo-Persian poet
 Omran (disambiguation) / Omrane

Arabic masculine given names
Pakistani masculine given names